The Little Darby Creek is a tributary to the Darby Creek System in central Ohio. The creeks are part of the Scioto River drainage basin.  Little Darby Creek runs from an area near the Lafayette-Plain City Road Bridge downstream to the confluence with Big Darby Creek near the Darby Creek Metro Park.  The village of Georgesville, Ohio forms the western edge of the Confluence.

The Little Darby and Big Darby were listed as a state Scenic River in 1984.  The creeks were listed as national Scenic Rivers in 1994.

Little Darby Creek for many years appeared to be bigger than Big Darby Creek at their confluence.  This was due to a concrete fill dam across the path of the Little Darby Creek just north of the confluence.  It was locally known as Oakie's dam.  The Franklin County Metro Park System later removed this structure.  The Little Darby creek bed has returned to it natural condition and the presence of the dam is now very hard to detect.

See also
List of rivers of Ohio

References

Rivers of Champaign County, Ohio
Rivers of Franklin County, Ohio
Rivers of Madison County, Ohio
Rivers of Union County, Ohio
Rivers of Ohio
Wild and Scenic Rivers of the United States